Gmina Sławno may refer to either of the following rural administrative districts in Poland:
Gmina Sławno, Łódź Voivodeship
Gmina Sławno, West Pomeranian Voivodeship